Smt. Kashibai Navale Medical College is a full-fledged medical college in Pune, Maharashtra. The college imparts the degree Bachelor of Medicine and Bachelor of Surgery (MBBS). It is recognised by Maharashtra University of Health Sciences and Medical Council of India. 

Selection to the college is done on the basis of merit through the National Eligibility and Entrance Test. Yearly undergraduate student intake is 150.

References

External links 
http://sknmcgh.org/

Medical colleges in Maharashtra
Universities and colleges in Maharashtra
Educational institutions established in 2007
2007 establishments in Maharashtra
Affiliates of Maharashtra University of Health Sciences